The collared babbler (Gampsorhynchus torquatus) is a species of bird in the family Pellorneidae. 
It is found in Laos, Malaysia, Myanmar, Thailand, and Vietnam.
Its natural habitats are subtropical or tropical moist lowland forest and subtropical or tropical moist montane forest.

References

Collar, N. J. & Robson, C. 2007. Family Timaliidae (Babblers)  pp. 70 – 291 in; del Hoyo, J., Elliott, A. & Christie, D.A. eds. Handbook of the Birds of the World, Vol. 12. Picathartes to Tits and Chickadees. Lynx Edicions, Barcelona.

collared babbler
Birds of Southeast Asia
collared babbler